The San Francisco Glacier is a glacier in Monumento Natural El Morado Natural Park a hundred kilometers away from Santiago, Chile. It is a tourist attraction.

References

Glaciers of Chile
Landforms of Santiago Metropolitan Region